The Adventures of Superman is a novel by George Lowther. It was first published in 1942 with illustrations by Joe Shuster, the co-creator of Superman. A facsimile edition was released in 1995 by Applewood Books, with a new introduction by Roger Stern.

This book is the first novelization of a comic book character, and also the first Superman story credited to someone other than Jerry Siegel. It was Lowther who first provided many now-familiar details of Superman's birth and early life. The first two chapters provided the first detailed description of the planet Krypton, and renamed Kal-El's parents Jor-El and Lara who previously had been named Jor-L and Lora. The next three chapters dealt with Clark Kent's childhood on the farm of his adoptive parents, Eben and Sarah Kent. (In the comics, the Kents suffered through many name changes before settling on Jonathan and Martha in 1952.) In the sixth chapter, Clark arrived in Metropolis and got a job with the Daily Planet, while the remaining eleven chapters deal with a mystery involving ghost ships and Nazi spies.

The book is illustrated with four full-page color illustrations, six full-page black-and-white illustrations, and numerous sketches, all examples of Joe Shuster's work.

The book was published as Armed Services Edition #656 in May, 1945.

1942 American novels
Superman novels
1942 fantasy novels
1942 science fiction novels
Random House books